Mark Deli Siljander (born June 11, 1951) is an American author and politician who served as a Republican U.S. Representative from the state of Michigan. He authored the book A Deadly Misunderstanding: A Congressman's Quest to Bridge the Muslim-Christian Divide.

In 2008, Siljander was indicted on charges of money laundering, conspiracy and obstruction of justice. In 2010, he pleaded guilty to obstruction of justice and acting as an unregistered foreign agent. In 2020, President Donald Trump  pardoned Siljander.

Early life, education, and early career 
Siljander was born in Chicago, Illinois, and graduated from Oak Park and River Forest High School in 1969. He received a Bachelor of Science and Master of Arts from Western Michigan University in Kalamazoo, Michigan.

Career 
He served as a trustee on Fabius Township Board in St. Joseph County, Michigan, from 1972 to 1976 and also worked as a real estate broker.

U.S. House of Representatives
Siljander served as a U.S. Representative from the Michigan's 4th congressional district from April 21, 1981 to January 3, 1987. He served on the House Foreign Affairs Committee. At the time of Siljander's election, Michigan's 4th congressional district covered southwestern Michigan and included Three Rivers and Kalamazoo. Time magazine noted that the district was predominantly conservative, having elected only one Democrat in [the twentieth] century, in 1932.

Siljander was known as a dogmatic social conservative. He criticized President Ronald Reagan's appointment of Sandra Day O'Connor to the Supreme Court, viewing her track record as insufficiently conservative. Time described him as a fundamentalist Christian. During his race, Siljander expressed opposition to the Equal Rights Amendment, pornography, abortion, school busing and "big spending," as well as support for the neutron bomb, the MX missile and prayer in public schools. In Congress, Siljander's voting record was generally consistent with most other Republicans, although he became known for his firebrand conservative rhetoric; for example, he denounced "secular humanists" as having a "perverted" philosophy.

1981 
On January 27, 1981, incumbent Congressman David Stockman resigned to serve as the director of the Office of Management and Budget in the Reagan administration. In the following special Republican primary, Siljander ranked first in a seven-candidate field with a plurality of 37%. He defeated Stockman-endorsed tax attorney John Globensky (36%) and State Senator John Mowat (22%). In the April 1981 special general election, he defeated Democratic Cass County Commissioner Johnie Rodebush 69%-29%.

1982
Siljander was challenged in the next Republican primary by attorney Harold Schuitmaker and defeated him 56%-44%. In the general election, he won re-election to a full term with 60% of the vote.

1984
Siljander was challenged again in the Republican primary, and defeated Tim Horan 58%-42%. In the general election, he won re-election to a second full term with 67% of the vote.

In 1984, Siljander sponsored a single-sentence amendment which read, "For the purposes of this Act, the term 'person' shall include unborn children from the moment of conception." Alexander Cockburn referred to the Siljander Amendment as "the most far-reaching of all the measures dreamed up by the conservative right to undercut Roe v. Wade." It failed 186-219.

In 1985, Siljander proposed legislation which would deny most favored nation status to countries that discriminate on cultural, ethnic or religious grounds.

1986
Once again Siljander was challenged in the Republican primary, this time by Fred Upton, a staffer to Stockman. Upton defeated Siljander 55%-45%, becoming the only Republican to unseat an incumbent in a primary that year. A key to his defeat was believed to be a tape sent to fundamentalist Christians in his district asking them to "break the back of Satan" by defeating Upton.

Later career
Siljander was appointed by President Reagan as an alternate representative to the United Nations General Assembly, serving from September 1987 to September 1988. He was an unsuccessful candidate in 1992 for nomination to the 103rd Congress from Virginia. He stated then his message was, "not religious values as much as it's common-sense American traditional values." He campaigned on a budget freeze, a ten percent flat tax and a line-item veto. In the Republican primary, Siljander came in second to Henry N. Butler, a law professor at George Mason University.

Siljander is the president of Bridges to Common Ground. He also founded Trac5, with the stated goal to build a bridge between Islam, Judaism and Christianity.

Siljander's book, A Deadly Misunderstanding: A Congressman's Quest to Bridge the Muslim-Christian Divide was a 2009 Nautilus Silver Award Winner, and has a foreword written by UN Secretary General Ban Ki Moon, with whom Siljander worked closely to resolve the humanitarian disaster in Darfur.

Siljander was featured in the 2019 Netflix miniseries The Family, which details the history and activities of The Fellowship, a secretive Christian organization with ties to politicians and world leaders.

Criminal conviction and pardon
On January 16, 2008, Siljander was indicted in the federal district court in the Western District of Missouri on five counts including money laundering, conspiracy and obstruction of justice. 
Siljander initially pleaded not guilty, but on July 7, 2010, as part of a plea agreement, Siljander pleaded guilty to obstruction of justice and acting as an unregistered foreign agent. On January 12, 2012, he was sentenced to a year and a day in prison.

The group for which Siljander worked as an unregistered foreign agent was the Islamic American Relief Agency, a Columbus, Missouri-based Islamic charity with ties to terrorism, which hired Siljander in early 2004 to lobby to get IARA removed from a Senate Finance Committee list of charities suspected of funding international terrorism. IARA closed in October 2004 after it was added to the Treasury Department's list of global terrorist organizations due to the group's links to Osama bin Laden, al-Qaida and the Taliban.

In December 2020, President Donald Trump pardoned Siljander, praising his anti-abortion record while a congressman and his post-prison work abroad. Trump's decision to pardon Siljander was criticized by Republican Congressman Fred Upton, who succeeded Siljander after defeating him in the 1986 Republican primary.

References

External links
Siljander at the Biographical Directory of the United States Congress
Author's page on Amazon 
Global Strategies, Inc.
Trac5
Bridges to Common Ground
A Deadly Misunderstanding

1951 births
20th-century American diplomats
20th-century American politicians
American Christian writers
American officials of the United Nations
George Wythe University alumni
Living people
Members of the Michigan House of Representatives
Michigan politicians convicted of crimes
People convicted of obstruction of justice
People from Fairfax County, Virginia
People from St. Joseph County, Michigan
Politicians from Chicago
Recipients of American presidential pardons
Republican Party members of the United States House of Representatives from Michigan
United Nations General Assembly officials
Virginia Republicans
Western Michigan University alumni